Since the Iran hostage crisis, the Islamic Republic of Iran has engaged in a pattern of detaining foreign nationals for extended periods. Dual nationals of Iran and another country are particularly vulnerable to arbitrary detention because the international Master Nationality Rule provides that "a State may not afford diplomatic protection to one of its nationals against a state whose nationality such person also possesses". According to the Center for Human Rights in Iran, the Iranian government has used imprisoned dual and foreign-only nationals "as bargaining chips in its dealings with other nations."

In November 2017, Reuters reported that Iran's Islamic Revolutionary Guard Corps (IRGC) had arrested "at least 30 dual nationals during the past two years, mostly on spying charges." According to Human Rights Watch, "Iranian authorities have violated detainees' due process rights and carried out a pattern of politically motivated arrests."

In September 2019, on the sidelines of the Seventy-fourth session of the United Nations General Assembly, families of dual and foreign nationals imprisoned in Iran as well former dual and foreign nationals imprisoned in Iran launched the "Alliance of Families Against State Hostage Taking."

In January 2023, France called for the release of seven nationals, who were held in Iran. One of the detainees, Fariba Adelkhak was arrested in June 2019, along with her colleague Roland Marchal. While Marchal was released in 2020, but Fraiban Adelkhak remained in prison amid mounting political tensions in Iran. 

This list of current and former detainees in Iran excludes people abducted in other countries and brought into the country.

Current foreign nationals imprisoned in Iran

U.S. citizens

U.S. permanent residents

Iran hostage crisis detainees

British citizens

List of British permanent residents

Canadian citizens

Canadian permanent residents

Australian citizens

New Zealand citizens

Lebanese citizens

French citizens

French permanent residents

German citizens

Austrian citizens

Russian citizens

Dutch citizens

Swedish citizens

Finnish citizens

Belgian citizens

Armenian citizens

South African citizens

See also
 Hostage diplomacy
 Human rights in Iran
 Lebanon hostage crisis

References

External links
 "Dual Nationals and Foreigners Held in Iran" (United States Institute of Peace)
 "Who Are the Dual and Foreign Nationals Imprisoned in Iran?" (Center for Human Rights in Iran)

Prisoners and detainees of Iran
Lists of prisoners and detainees
Human rights abuses in Iran